Jiří Burger (born May 8, 1977) is a Czech professional ice hockey player. He played with HC Vítkovice in the Czech Extraliga during the 2010–11 Czech Extraliga season.

References

External links 
 
 

1977 births
Living people
Czech ice hockey forwards
HC Vítkovice players
Sportspeople from Kladno
Czech expatriate ice hockey players in Finland